Sandy Creek is a river in the United States state of Virginia.  It is a tributary of the Banister River.

See also
List of rivers of Virginia

References

USGS Geographic Names Information Service
USGS Hydrologic Unit Map - State of Virginia (1974)

Rivers of Virginia
Rivers of Halifax County, Virginia
Rivers of Pittsylvania County, Virginia
Tributaries of the Roanoke River